David Pérez Sanz (born 15 May 1994) is a Spanish tennis player.

Pérez Sanz has a career high ATP singles ranking of 216, achieved on 6 June 2016. He also has a career high ATP doubles ranking of 158 achieved on 19 September 2016. Pérez Sanz has won 1 ATP Challenger doubles title, 12 ITF singles Futures titles and 36 ITF doubles Futures titles.

In July 2016, Pérez Sanz won the 2016 Tampere Open doubles title, partnering Max Schnur.

As of January 28, 2019, Pérez Sanz is number 1 in the ITF World Tennis Singles Ranking.

ATP Challenger and ITF Futures finals

Singles: 39 (20–19)

Doubles: 71 (52–19)

External links
 
 
 David Pérez Sanz, un Nº1 sin ranking ATP – Fernando Murciego, Punto de Break, February 3, 2019

1994 births
Living people
Spanish male tennis players
Mediterranean Games bronze medalists for Spain
Mediterranean Games medalists in tennis
Competitors at the 2013 Mediterranean Games